The Abagusii (also known as Kisii (Mkisii/Wakisii) in Swahili, or Gusii in Ekegusii) are a highly diverse East African ethnic group and nation indigenous to Kisii (formerly Kisii District) and Nyamira counties of former Nyanza, as well as parts of Kericho and Bomet counties of the former Rift Valley province of Kenya. The Abagusii are unrelated to the Kisi people of Malawi and the Kissi people of West Africa, other than the three communities having similar sounding names.

The Abagusii traditionally inhabit Nyamira and Kisii counties, as well as sections of Kericho and Bomet counties, all of which were within the former Nyanza and Rift Valley provinces of Kenya. Studies of East African Bantu languages and anthropological evidence suggests that the Abagusii, together with Kuria, Ngurimi, Rangi, Mbugwe, Simbiti, Zanaki and Ikoma, emerged from East African Neolithic agropastoralists and hunters/gatherers believed to have come from the North of Mt. Elgon. It's also believed that there was heavy influence on the Abagusii from Bantu speakers migrating out of Central Africa and West Africa; certain groups of the Abagusii may have been assimilated from the Luhya and Olusuba speaking Suba people, which originated from west of Lake Victoria. The majority of Abagusii are closely related to the Maasai, Kipsigis, Abakuria, and Ameru of Kenya.

The Abagusii also have a close linguistic relationship with the Ngurimi, Rangi, Mbugwe, Simbiti, Zanaki, Ikoma and Maragoli people. They speak the Ekegusii language which is classified with the Great Lakes Bantu languages. However, the inclusion of Abagusii in the Bantu language group is a subject of debate, given that studies on East African Bantu languages have found Ekegusii, together with the Kuria, Simbiti, Ngurimi, Rangi and Mbugwe languages to be rather distinct from other Bantu languages in terms of structure and tense.

Etymology

The term Kisii is Swahili and originates from the colonial British administration, who used it in colonial Kenya to refer to the Abagusii people, as it was much easier to pronounce. The term Kisii, however, has no meaning in the Ekegusii language. In the Swahili language, the singular form is Mkisii and the plural form is Wakisii; the Swahili name for the Ekegusii language is Kikisii. The term is now popularly used in Kenya to refer to Abagusii people.

Among the Abagusii, the name Kisii does not refer to the people, but to a town — Kisii, also called Bosongo or Getembe by the locals, is the major native urban center of the Abagusii people. The name Bosongo is believed to have originated from Abasongo, which means "the whites" or "the place where white people settle(d))", referring to settlers living in the town during the colonial era.

The other name used by the British in reference to Abagusii were Kosova/Kossowa which is derivative of the Ekegusii expression "Inka Sobo", meaning home. The endonym is Abagusii (plural), and Omogusii (singular); the language spoken by the people is Ekegusii. The term "Gusii" supposedly comes from Mogusii, the founder of the community.

History

Origins
Based on linguistic and anthropological evidence, the Abagusii originated from the neolithic agropastoralist inhabitants of present-day Kenya, particularly from the former Nyanza and Rift Valley provinces. The competing theory by some scholars that the Abagusii migrated from Uganda is lacking, as there's no historical evidence the Abagusii settled in Uganda and have been known to only settle on the eastern slopes of the Kenyan side of Mt. Elgon.

The oral tradition of the Abagusii holds that their ancestors migrated from a place called Misiri, north of Mt. Elgon, possibly in present-day Egypt. These ancestors were the founders of the six major Gusii clans: the Abagetutu, Abanyaribari, Abagirango, Abanchari, Abamachoge, and Ababasi. This original group later absorbed a group of settlers from west of Lake Victoria, what is now present day Buganda and Busoga; these settlers may have been assimilated from the Luhya and Olusuba-speaking Suba people.

Many similarities have been drawn between Abagusii culture and the cultures of some Cushitic communities, specifically, the Konso and Oromo. Both communities have historically depended on herding, and Ekegusii shares some features with Cushitic languages not found in other Bantu languages.  These similarities suggest that Abagusii share, at least partially, origins with some Cushitic and Nilotic communities.

Settlement in Gusiiland

Present-day Gusiiland, along with Kenya and East Africa at large, has been inhabited since the Neolithic period. As a result, its settlers have diverse origins. The first settlers were likely hunter/gathers similar to the Khoisan and Ogiek, which were followed by the Nyanza/Rift Cushites who replaced these hunters-gatherers, assimilating them, and settled during the Savanna Pastoral Neolithic period (ca.3200-1300 BC) The next group of settlers were Nilotic pastoralists from present-day South Sudan that settled in the area circa. 500 BC. The last group to settle in the area are Bantu speakers, whose migration to the area began in 1 AD. Several  southern Nilotics and southern Cushitics were assimilated into the Abagusii, whom are likely responsible for the Gusii practice of circumcision and other practices due to cultural diffusion.

Colonial Era 

The Abagusii were seen as warlike and fierce fighters by other ethnic groups, along with the Ameru, Abakuria and Maasai; the Abagetutu specifically were seen as the most martial of all Abagusii Clans. This perception is evident in excerpts from the East African Protectorate Commissioner Sir Charles Eliot in early 1900s expeditions of Gusiiland and surrounding areas:

Their warlike nature was deemed as a threat to British rule, especially the cattle camps the warriors frequented, and the British enacted punitive expeditions that raided cattle and crushed the warriors. This slowly brought an end to the pastoral and war-based lifestyle of most Abagusii.

The British introduced new immigrants to Kisii County and other parts of Kenya in the 1930s to work as soldiers, porters and farmers. These were the Baganda, the Maragoli, the Nubi, and the Olusuba-speaking Suba people (Kenya) from Rusinga Island, Mfangano Island, and sections of Homa Bay County. The Nubians were settled by the British in present-day Kisii town and worked as soldiers for the British government, while the Bantu speaking Maragoli, Baganda, and Suba people were settled in Kisii town as porters and laborers on white farms and tea plantations. Some of the new immigrants introduced to Kisii town by the British have been largely assimilated into the Gusii society, but others, particularly the Nubi, never assimilated and still maintain their original settlement in Kisii town.

Post-Colonial 
In the post-colonial age, the Abagusii have expanded out of their traditional range, settling in the major towns of the Luo-Nyanza counties, like Homa Bay, Migori, Kisumu and Siaya as well as other Kenyan towns and cities. There is also a significant diaspora population in the United States (particularly Minnesota), the United Kingdom, Canada, New Zealand, Australia, and South Africa.

Relationship with other peoples

Relationship with Nilotic speakers

The relationship between the Abagusii and their neighbouring Nilotic speaking communities (such as Maasai, Nandi, Kipsigis, Luo) is often painted negatively on social media. The colonial perceptions of Nilotics as more hostile and warlike have continued to persist in wider Kenyan discourse as evidenced by works of scholars and researchers such as Ochieng and Ogot among others. These scholars have exploited such colonial stereotypes and largely stereotyped the Nilotic speaking communities in their works. Despite these stereotypes, the Abagusii have often maintained positive relationships with their Nilotic neighbours in the pre- and post-colonial era. Prior to colonization, the Abagusii engaged in barter trade with these communities, especially the Luo people, and at times, worked together  to defeat cattle raiders. The co-existence between the Abagusii and the neighbouring Nilotic communities was largely peaceful, despite these communities and Abagusii occasionally clashing in sometimes violent cattle rustles and grazing land conflicts.

Relationship with East African Bantu speakers

During the pre-colonial period, the Abagusii mostly had contact with their immediate, Nilotic-speaking neighbours. As a result, there was limited contact between the Abagusii and Bantu-speaking communities, as indicated by Ekegusii having features not found in other Bantu languages. However, not all Bantu-speaking groups were cut off from the Abagusii. The Bantu-speaking groups in contact with the Abagusii in pre-colonial Kenya include the Kuria, Zanaki, Ikoma, Rangi, Mbugwe, Ngurimi, Simbiti, some Suba clans, and the Maragoli. In the post-colonial period, however, contact with other Bantu speaking communities both inside and outside of Kenya has dramatically increased, both from British population relocations and the advent of modern transportation.

Etymology of Bantu and relevance to Abagusii

The modern usage of the term "Bantu" was only developed in the 19th century with the advent of European colonization; prior to colonization, no such division existed in Africa. This categorization of Africa's people into distinct, internally homogeneous groups is seen as generalizing at best, and inaccurate at worst. In the context of the Abagusii together with Kuria, Zanaki, Ikoma, Rangi, Mbugwe, Ngurimi, and Simbiti, some linguistic and cultural evidence indicate that they may be more influenced by Nilotic and Cushitic communities than other Bantu groups.

Economic activities

Agriculture and herding 
During the pre-colonial era, the Abagusii cultivated finger millet, sorgum, barley, pumpkin, and other native crops; ox-drawn plows and iron hoes were used for cultivating crops. However, the Abagusii were mainly pastoralists and hunter-gatherers who primarily relied on their cattle, goats, sheep, and to a lesser extent, poultry for food. In the 19th century, Europeans introduced tea, coffee, bananas/plantains, and most importantly, maize. By the 1920s, maize quickly replaced finger millet and sorghum as a staple and cash crop. By the 1930s, tea and coffee had become major cash crops.

Today, the Abagusii still continue to keep livestock and poultry alongside farming, along with old agricultural practices; some crops they cultivate today include: cassava, potatoes, tomatoes, bananas, beans, onions, tropical fruits, and peas among others. Farming remains a dominant activity in Gusiiland due to high population density.

Industrial activities

During the pre-colonial period, Abagusii produced iron tools, weapons, decorations, wooden implements, pottery, and baskets. The Abagusii also imported pottery from the neighbouring Luo community. Blacksmiths and other occupations that worked with iron and iron ore were highly respected and influential members of Abagusii society, despite not forming a distinct societal caste; smithing was largely carried out by men.

Trade

The primary form of trade carried out in pre-colonial times was barter, and mostly took place within homesteads, as well as with neighbouring communities, especially the Luo; tools, weapons, crafts, livestock, and agricultural products were commonly exchanged. Cattle were an important form of currency, and goats served a lower valued currency. Barter trade between the Abagusii and the Luo took place at border markets and Abagusii farms, and was mainly carried out by women.

In the modern age, the Abagusii have established shopping centers, shops, and markets, further connecting them to the rest of Kenya, as opposed to their comparatively isolated pre-colonial economies.

Division of labor

Traditionally, Abagusii society divided labor between men and women. Women were expected to cook, brew, clean, cultivate and process crops, and fetch water and firewood; men were expected to herd, build houses and fences, clear crop fields, among other duties. Men were less involved in crop cultivation compared to women. Herding was primarily carried out by boys and unmarried men, and girls and unmarried women helped with crop cultivation. This division of labor has broken down over time, and women have gradually taken over many of the men's traditional duties.

Language

The Abagusii speak Ekegusii ('Omonwa Bwekegusii'), which is currently classified with the Great Lakes Bantu languages. However, recent studies on East African Bantu have found the Ekegusii, together with the Kuria, Simbiti/Egesuba, Ngurimi, Rangi, and Mbugwe languages, to be very distinct from other Bantu languages in terms of structure and tense. These languages have been found to be more similar to Nilotic and Cushitic languages in several structural and tense aspects. This raises the question of whether or not the Ekegusii, Kuria, Ngurimi, Simbiti, Rangi, and Mbugwe languages should be removed from the Bantu language group and be grouped in a separate language family instead.

Culture

Coming-of-age rituals 
Among the Abagusii, circumcising boys without anesthesia around 10 is an important rite of passage; girls also have a similar rite of passage, undergoing female genital mutilation at an earlier age. Traditionally, the Abagusii did not marry into tribes that did not practice circumcision, though this practice has declined in recent generations. The ritual typically takes place every year in the months of November and December, followed by a period of seclusion where boys are led in different activities by older boys, and girls are led by older girls. During this period, only older circumcised boys and girls are allowed to visit the initiates. It is considered taboo for anyone else to visit during this time. In this period of isolation, the male initiates are taught their roles as young men in the community, and the code of conduct of a circumcised man. Initiated boys and girls were also taught the rules of shame ("chinsoni") and respect ("ogosika"). This is a time of celebration for families and the community at large. Family, friends, and neighbours are invited days in advance by the candidates to join the family in celebration.

Music 
The Abagusii traditionally play a large bass lyre called obokano, alongside drums and flutes. Some of the notable musicians from the Abagusii community include: Nyashinski, Rajiv Okemwa Raj, Ringtone, Mwalimu Arisi O'sababu, Christopher Monyoncho, Sungusia, Riakimai '91 Jazz, Embarambamba, Bonyakoni Kirwanda junior band, Mr Ong'eng'o, Grandmaster Masese, Deepac Braxx (The Heavyweight Mc), Jiggy, Mr. Bloom, Virusi, Babu Gee, Brax Rnb, Sabby Okengo, Machoge One Jazz, among others.

Art 
The Abagusii are also known for their world-famous soapstone sculptures, called "chigware", which are mostly concentrated in the southern parts of Kisii County, around Tabaka town.

Religion

Prior to the introduction of Christianity and Islam to Africa, the Abagusii were monotheistic, believing in a supreme God called 'Engoro'; this God is also popularly called 'Nyasae', a loanword from Dholuo language, among Abagusii. The Abagusii believe that Engoro created the Universe, and was the source of all life. The sun (Risase') and stars are both important in the Abagusii religion. Death, disease, and destruction of crops and livestock were considered unnatural events brought on by evil spirits, bad luck, witchcraft, or the displeasure of ancestor spirits. The Abagusii also revered medicine men and practiced ancestor worship, calling the ancestor spirits "Ebirecha."

Today, most Abagusii practice Christianity, with the four major denominations being Catholicism, the Seventh-day Adventist Church, Swedish Lutheranism, and Pentecostal Assemblies of God. A minority of Abagusii still adhere to their traditional religion, and others observe a syncretic form of their traditional religion and Christianity. Many still go to visit a diviner ('''omoragori') who can point out displeased spirits of the dead and prescribe solutions on placating them.

Marriage

Traditionally, marriage was arranged by the parents, who used intermediaries called "chisigani"; these intermediaries acted as referees for the future bride and groom. After the parents negotiated the dowry, the wedding would be organized. The wedding ceremony involved a mentor, called an "omoimari", who could provide continuing support to the newly married couple. Marriage between members of the same clan was traditionally forbidden. Marriage was officially established through the payment of dowry in the form of cattle to the wife's family. Afterwards, the man and woman are officially considered husband and wife. Divorce is customarily not allowed among Abagusii, as marriage is considered a permanent union that is only disrupted by death. Currently, civil and Christian marriages are recognized among the Abagusii.

Household

The typical Gusii family unit is composed of a man, his wives, and their children, living on the same land. This was divided into two components: the homestead ("Omochie") and the cattle camps ("Ebisarate"). The married man, his wives, and their unmarried daughters and uncircumcised boys lived in the omochie. The ebisarate, situated in the grazing fields, was protected by the male warriors against theft by cattle rustlers and raiders.

 Architecture 
A typical Gusii house has conical grass thatched roofs, and is typically round, though sometimes rectangular, in shape. Today, Gusii houses are still similar, though corrugated iron sheets and stone is sometimes used for the roofs and walls.

The traditional Gusii compound had elevated granaries for storing crops, such as millet and other crops. The Abagusii customarily built fortified walls and dug trenches around their homesteads and villages to protect against cattle rustling and raids by neighbouring communities. However, in 1913, the cattle camps were abolished by the British, forcing Abagusii to live in dispersed homesteads.

 Cuisine 
The original diet of Abagusii prior to colonization consisted of meat, milk, and blood from livestock, cereals from millet and sorghum, as wells as fruits, vegetables, birds, edible insects ("chintuga"), and wild meat obtained through hunting and gathering. The post-colonial diet of Abagusii and other African tribes has been transformed and influenced by interactions with the European colonists that introduced new crops and farming methods to Gusiiland and Africa.

The staple meal is obokima, which is a dish of millet flour or sorghum flour cooked with water to a hardened dough-like consistency. It is often served with rinagu, chinsaga, rikuneni, enderema, emboga, omotere, risosa, egesare, among other local green leaves consumed as vegetables. It's served with milk, particularly sour milk from livestock; it can also be served with any other stew. The Ekegusii word for "having a meal" ('ragera') usually connotes a meal involving obokima at the centre. By 1920s, maize was introduced to Gusiiland and had overtaken finger millet and sorghum as staple crops and cash crops. As a result, maize is now largely used to prepare obokima. Ritoke (plural: "amatoke"), a dish of cooked and flavored bananas, is a popular snack, but is considered a supplemental food, and not a proper meal.

 Social organization 
The social organization of Abagusii is clan-based and decentralized in nature. The Abagusii society is less based on social/caste stratifications compared to other societies, and there was little hierarchical strata based on caste or social status.  For instance, certain professions like iron smiths ("oboturi") and warriors ("oborwani"/"chinkororo") were generally respected, but did not form a distinct caste.

Political organization

The Abagusii had a decentralized and clan-based form of government. Each clan had their own independent government and leader; the clan leader ("omorwoti/omogambi") was the highest leadership rank for all clans and was equivalent to a king/chief role.  It is common for the Abagusii men refer to their peers within the community as 'erwoti' or omogambi' when talking. There were also lower leadership ranks unique to individual clans. Warriors held an important role as the defenders of the community and their shared wealth in the form of cows.

Notable Abagusii people
 David Kenani Maraga, President of the Supreme Court of Kenya
 Zachary Onyonka, Minister of Education, then of Foreign Affairs
 Sam Ongeri, Senator for Kisii County
 Fred Matiang'i, Cabinet Secretary for the Ministry of Interior and Coordination of National Security
 Simeon Nyachae, Cabinet Minister
 James Ongwae, Governor of Kisii County
 Janet Ong'era, Kisii County Woman Member of the National Assembly
 John Nyagarama, Governor of Nyamira County
 Okongo Omogeni, Senator for Nyamira County
 George Anyona, Member of Parliament for Kitutu East/Masaba

References

Further reading
 Greenberg, J., 1963. : Contributions to the History of Bantu Linguistics: Papers Contributed 1935-1960 . C. M. Doke, D. T. Cole. American Anthropologist, 65(5), pp. 1193-1194.
 LeVine, Robert A., Sarah LeVine, P. Herbert Leiberman, T. Betty Brazelton, Suzanne Dixon, Amy Richman, and Constance H. Keefer (1994). Child Care and Culture: Lessons from Africa. Cambridge: Cambridge University Press.
 LeVine, Robert A. (1959). "Gusii Sex Offenses: A Study in Social Control". American Anthropologist 61:965-990.
 LeVine, Robert A., and Barbara B. LeVine (1966). Nyansongo: A Gusii Community in Kenya. Six Cultures Series, vol. 2. New York: John Wiley & Sons.
 LeVine, Sarah (1979). Mothers and Wives: Gusii Women of East Africa. Chicago: University of Chicago Press.
 LeVine, Sarah, and Robert A. LeVine (forthcoming). Stability and Stress: The Psychosocial History of an African Community.
 Mayer, Philip (1950). "Gusii Bridewealth Law and Custom". The Rhodes-Livingstone Papers, no. 18. London: Oxford University Press.
 Mayer, Philip (1949). "The Lineage Principle in Gusii Society". International African Institute Memorandum'' no. 24. London: Oxford University Press.

External links
 The Gusii blog
 Gusii people
 Kisii-English English-Kisii Language Dictionary
 Gusii language dictionary